Gambler is a 1971 Indian Hindi-language crime thriller film directed by Amarjeet. The film stars Dev Anand, Zaheeda, Shatrughan Sinha.

Plot
Raja (Dev Anand) has been abandoned by his biological mother at a very young age, and grows up with Master (Jeevan), a criminal don and card-sharp, who would like Raja to continue working with him on a commission basis. Raja learns all that could be learned about playing cards, quits work with Master, and starts work on his own. He succeeds considerably, and soon gets rich and wealthy. He falls in love with beautiful Chandra Gangaram (Zaheeda), and would like to marry her. But her father would like her to marry U.K. settled Ram Mehta (Sudhir), before Raja could do or say anything against this alliance, he is charged with the cold-blooded murder of Master. The climax in Raja's life is in the Court Room where he will find out about his past, and about his parents – while he awaits the outcome of the trial.

Cast
 Dev Anand ...  Raja 
 Zaheeda ...  Chandra Gangaram 
 Kishore Sahu ...  Public Prosecutor 
 Shatrughan Sinha ...  Banke Bihari 
 Sudhir ...  Ram Mehta 
 Zaheera ...  Julie (as Zahira) 
 Jeevan ...  Master 
 Manorama ...  Ram's aunt 
 Tabassum ... Chandra's friend
 Mumtaz Begum  ...  Seeta Devi 
 Iftekhar ... Police Commissioner
 Sachin ... Georgie
 Rashid Khan ... as Georgie's father
 Jagdish Raj ...  Inspector Ranade 
 Ravikant
 Moolchand ... as godown owner
 Meena T ... as Mary, Manorama's maid
 Sapru as Gangaram
 Ratan Gaurang ... as jockey in Darjeeling

Soundtrack

The music for all the songs were composed by S. D. Burman and the lyrics were penned by Gopal Das Neeraj.

 "Mera Man Tera Pyasa" was featured in the soundtrack of the 2004 film Eternal Sunshine of the Spotless Mind.

References

External links
 

1971 films
1970s Hindi-language films
1970s crime thriller films
Indian crime thriller films
Films scored by S. D. Burman